The 1966 Coppa delle Alpi shows the results of the 1966 tournament that was held as a preseason event to the 1966/67 season. The Coppa delle Alpi (translated as Cup of the Alps) was a football tournament, jointly organized by the Italian national league and the Swiss League as a pre-season event.

Overview 
This season the Cup of the Alps was played as a league tournament with four teams from Switzerland and four teams from Italy. Each team played four games against the teams from the other country. The teams did not play compatriots. This year there was no cup final, the league leader was the cup winner. The tournament was not held the previous year, 1965. Therefore, the defending champions would have been Genoa from the 1964 edition, but they did not compete this year.

Matches

First round

Second round

Third round

Fourth round 

Note: Sport Judge decision the game was awarded 3–0, after the match was abandoned at 2–2 in the 74th minute following Juventus protest.

Standings

Sources and references 
 Cup of the Alps 1966 at RSSSF
 Coppa delle Alpi 1966 at myjuve.it
 Alpencup at fcb-archiv.ch

Cup of the Alps
Alps